Sanjeev Shyam Singh is an Indian politician, currently a member of Janata Dal (United) and a member of Bihar Legislative Council. He has been raising various issues like air pollution in Bihar cities, raised voice against prohibition and delay in land mutation.

References 

Year of birth missing (living people)
Living people
Members of the Bihar Legislative Council
Janata Dal (United) politicians